Paramanandayya Sishyulu is a 1950 Indian Telugu-language swashbuckling comedy film, produced and directed by Kasturi Siva Rao under the Allied Productions banner. It stars Akkineni Nageswara Rao, Lakshmi Rajyam, C.S.R. and music jointly composed by Ogirala Ramachandra Rao and Susarla Dakshinamurthi. The film was remade again in Telugu in 1966 as Paramanandayya Sishyula Katha starring N. T. Rama Rao, K. R. Vijaya in pivotal roles, which went on to be remade in Kannada in 1981 as Guru Shishyaru.

Plot
Once upon a time, there was a kingdom Kalinga, ruled by King Vijayasena his younger brother Prachandasena (Gadepalli Ramaiah) a malicious, aspires to conquer the kingdom. One night he tries to eliminate him when the king is shielded by a man in a veil and shifts him to a safe place. After that, Prachandasena occupies the throne when anarchy arises due to his waywardness. So, the public starts shifting to the forest along with chief minister Paramanandayya (C.S.R) who associates them as disciples and makes a hamlet. Meanwhile, in the fort, a wrestling competition is held in which a young & energetic guy Chandrasena (Akkineni Nageswara Rao) wins but Prachandasena identifies him as the son of a traitor, exiled from the kingdom. So, he makes him prison when Leela (Lakshmi Rajyam) daughter of Vijayasena falls and secretly meets him. Spotting it, enraged Prachandasena torments, Leela. Thereafter, the man in a veil relieves Chandrasena even Leela along with Hema (Girija) daughter of Prachandasena escapes from the fort. Parallelly, Vijayasena becomes terminally ill, before dying, he reaches Paramanandayya's hamlet and reveals regarding a secret hidden treasure. Eventually, in search of Leela Chandrasena also lands at the hamlet and accompanies them. On the other side, Paramanandayya's disciples create a lot of nuisance. After a comic tale, Paramanandayya feels pity for their innocence, leaves that place and signs in to a cowherds' colony where he meets Leela & Hema and divulges the entire story. At present, Paramanandayya determines to get back the kingdom, so, plays with wit by informing Prachandasena about the hidden treasure. Being cognizant of it, avaricious Prachandasena moves with his army where Chandrasena attacks them with the disciples. Fortunately, the man in the veil also arrives, he stabs out Prachandasena and he too hits him. Before leaving his last breath, as a flabbergast, Prachandasena identifies the man in veil is his son Udeyasena (Narayana Rao). Finally, the movie ends on a happy note with the marriage and crowning ceremony of Chandrasena & Leela.

Cast

Akkineni Nageswara Rao as Chandrasena
Lakshmi Rajyam as Leela
C.S.R. as Paramanandayya
Relangi as Sishyudu
Kasturi Siva Rao as Avataram
Gadepalli Ramaiah as Prachandasenudu
Nalla Ramanurthy as Sishyudu
Narayana Rao as Udayasena / Musuku Manishi
Enum as Sishyudu
Raojulapalli as Sishyudu
Girija as Hema
Hemalatha as Shanta
Surabhi Balasaraswathi
Seeta
Ramalakshmi
Savitri
Saroja

Crew
Art: S. V. S. Rama Rao
Choreography: Pasumarthi, C. Ram Murthy
Stills: M. Satyam, K. Satyam
Fights: Stunt Somu & Party
Dialogues — Lyrics: Tapi Dharma Rao
Playback: Susarla Dakshinamurthi, P. Leela, A.V. Saraswati, K.Rani, Relangi, Kasturi Siva Rao, CSR
Music: Ogirala Ramachandra Rao, Susarla Dakshinamurthi 
Story: Tapi Dharma Rao
Editing: P. V. Manikyam, K. A. Sriraamulu
Cinematography: B. Subba Rao
Producer — Director: Kasturi Siva Rao
Banner: Allied Productions
Release Date: 6 October 1950

Soundtrack

Music composed by Ogirala Ramachandra Rao, Susarla Dakshinamurthi. Lyrics were written by Tapi Dharma Rao. Music released on Audio Company.

References

Indian comedy films
Films based on Indian folklore
Films scored by Susarla Dakshinamurthi
1950 comedy films
1950 films
Indian black-and-white films
Films scored by Ogirala Ramachandra Rao